The Symphony No. 19 in D major, Hoboken I/19, is a symphony by Joseph Haydn. The symphony was  composed between 1757 and 1761.

It is scored for 2 oboes, bassoon, 2 horns, strings and continuo. The symphony is homotonal and in three movements:

Allegro molto, 
Andante, D minor, 
Presto,

References

Symphony 019
Compositions in D major